Kallie Flynn Childress (born April 13, 1988) is an American actress. She is best known for her role as Yancy in the 2004 film Sleepover, for which she won a Young Artist Award for Best Performance in a Feature Film - Supporting Young Actress at the 2005 ceremony.

Career
Born in Chicago, Illinois, Childress began acting at the age of five appearing in numerous musical theatre productions. She attended and graduated from  Barbizon Modeling and Acting School in Chicago. Besides Sleepover, she appeared in television series Judging Amy, CSI: Miami, Days of Our Lives, Cougar Town and Good Luck Charlie. In 2011, she appeared in the short film Dark All Around.

Childress is also a singer-songwriter, she has released music via the iTunes Store.

Filmography

References

External links

1988 births
Living people
20th-century American actresses
21st-century American actresses
Actresses from Chicago
American child actresses
American film actresses
American musical theatre actresses
American television actresses